Visiting Tutor is a South Korean television program that airs on Mnet.

The program will become a regular program starting from December.

Program
The program opened applications for students or parents of their children, who want to take up 1-to-1 tuition from the home tutors recruited by the program. The home tutors will then visit the homes of the picked registrants and conduct 1-to-1 tuition, while at the same time giving life lessons and advice. Upon completion of their first lessons, for the next lessons tests will be conducted, and if the students do not score more than 90 marks, the home tutors will end their provisions of tuition to the students.

The hosts and studio guests watch the ways the tutors conduct their lessons in the studio and provide some commentaries about their ways of teaching.

Host
Park Myeong-su
Kim Sung-joo
San E
Kim Eun-young (Vice-principal of a tuition academy) (Fixed studio guest)

Tutors

Episodes

References

Mnet (TV channel) original programming